The 2016 Brazil men's Olympic basketball team was the men's national basketball team of Brazil that competed at the 2016 Summer Olympics, in Rio de Janeiro, Brazil. They automatically qualified, after FIBA voted to allow them to qualify as hosts, in a meeting at Tokyo, in August 2015. The team's head coach since 2010 was Rubén Magnano, and had Gustavo de Conti (Paulistano Basketball), Demétrius Ferraciú (Bauru Basketball), and José Alves Neto (Flamengo Basketball) as assistant coaches.

Timeline
 June 10, 2016: 14-man roster announced
 June 24: Start of training camp
 July 23 – August 2: Exhibition games
 August 6–21: 2016 Summer Olympics

Roster

The following were also candidates to make the team:

Exhibition games

Olympic play

Preliminary round

Lithuania

Spain

Croatia

Argentina

Nigeria

References

Notes

External links
 Official site 

Brazil national basketball team
Brazil
2016–17 in Brazilian basketball